A Kiss Before You Go: Live in Hamburg is the first live album by Norwegian band Katzenjammer. It was released on May 25, 2012 by the Universal Music Group. It was recorded at Große Freiheit 36 during the Hamburg, Germany dates of the tour, and was released in both CD and DVD format. The DVD contains the concert performance and music videos, and the CD includes nineteen songs.

Background
The album was recorded at Große Freiheit 36 on November 2011, during the Hamburg stop of their tour, which was promoting their 2011 studio album A Kiss Before You Go. 
It was released in both DVD and CD formats. The DVD release consists of the full nineteen song set list and promotional music videos, while the CD features the nineteen songs from the DVD.

Track listing

CD

DVD

Release history

References

2012 live albums
2012 video albums
Katzenjammer (band) albums
Live video albums